Cynoglossus capensis, commonly known as the Sand tonguesole is a species of tonguefish. It is commonly found in southeastern Atlantic Ocean off the south western coast of Africa from the Cunene River to the Cape of Good Hope. It is normally found at depths of no greater than 100m, but it has also been reported on the continental slope.

References
Fishbase

Cynoglossidae
Fish described in 1858